Spiridon Trikoupis (20 April 1788 – 24 February 1873) was a Greek statesman, diplomat, author and orator. He was the first Prime Minister of Greece (1833) and member of provisional governments of Greece since 1826.

He was born in Missolonghi and was son of the primate of Missolonghi, Ioannis Trikoupis. After studying in Paris and London, he became private secretary to Frederick North, 5th Earl of Guilford, Governor of the Ionian Islands.

During the Greek War of Independence, he occupied several important administrative and diplomatic posts. He was a member of the provisional government in 1826, a member of the national convention at Troezen in 1827, and president of the council and minister of foreign affairs in 1832. He was appointed the first Prime Minister of Greece in 1833. He was thrice Greek minister (ambassador) to London (1834–1837, 1841–1843 and 1849–1862), and in 1850 envoy-extraordinary to Paris.

His funeral oration for his friend Lord Byron, delivered in the cathedral of Missolonghi in 1824 was translated into many languages. A collection of his earlier religious and political orations was published in Paris in 1836. He was the author of Istoria tis Ellinikis Epanastaseos (London, 1853–1857), his work on the history of the Greek revolution. He was the father of Charilaos Trikoupis, also a Prime Minister of Greece.

References

External links
 

1788 births
1873 deaths
19th-century prime ministers of Greece
19th-century Greek historians
People from Missolonghi
Foreign ministers of Greece
Prime Ministers of Greece
Greek people of the Greek War of Independence
English Party politicians